Politics of Love (also known as Love Barack) is a 2011 romantic comedy film directed by William Dear. Bollywood actress Mallika Sherawat and American actor Brian J. White play leading roles.

Plot
The film involves the unexpected romance that develops between an Indian-American, Democratic campaign worker Aritha (formerly Rithika) Gupta (Mallika Sherawat) who falls for an African-American Republican Kyle Franklin (Brian White) in the month leading up to the 2008 U.S. Presidential Election.

Cast
 Brian J. White as Kyle Franklin
 Mallika Sherawat as Aretha Gupta
 Loretta Devine as Shirlee Gupta
 Ruby Dee as Grandma 'Estelle' Roseanne Gupta
 Gerry Bednob as Vijay Gupta
 Gabrielle Dennis as Chelsea
 Will Keenan as Terrence Miller
 Sueann Han as Bianca
 Ian Reed Kesler as Brent Murphy
 Tracey Walter as Glen
 Camille Kitt as Merry Christian
 Kennerly Kitt as Merry Christian
 Carlene Moore as Kathleen

Release and box office 
Politics of Love was released in US theaters on August 26, followed by its digital distribution on demand from September 3, 2011.

Review 
Politics of Love is amusing entertainment according to the Los Angeles Times. Politics of Love is a light and amusing fun movie. Mallika Sherawat was panned for her performance in this film, quoted as "trying too hard".

References

External links
 

2011 films
2011 romantic comedy films
American romantic comedy films
Films about elections
Films directed by William Dear
2010s English-language films
2010s American films